Patrice Kuchna (born 10 May 1963) is a former tennis player from France.  He did not win any Grand Prix tour singles titles during his professional career.

Kuchna was born in Denain, Nord, in the Nord-Pas-de-Calais region. The right-hander reached his highest singles ATP-ranking on 2 January 1984, when he became the World No. 125.  Kuchna won against Andre Agassi at Roland Garros, going to the 1/8.

He is the personal tennis coach of Emmanuel Macron, french president.

References

External links
 
 

1963 births
Living people
French male tennis players
Sportspeople from Nord (French department)